Ust-Orda Buryat Autonomous Okrug was an autonomous okrug of Russia within Irkutsk Oblast. After a 16 April 2006 referendum, in which almost 90% of participants voted for unification with Irkutsk Oblast, the autonomous okrug was merged into the oblast on 1 January 2008. The territory has since been administrated as the Ust-Orda Buryat Okrug of Irkutsk Oblast.

History

Russian Federation 
From 1993, the autonomous okrug was both an independent federal subject of Russia and a part of Irkutsk oblast until it was officially merged with the Irkutsk Oblast on January 1, 2008.

Merger 
In a referendum held on April 16, 2006, the majority of residents in Irkutsk Oblast and Ust-Orda Buryat Autonomous Okrug agreed to the unification of the two regions. According to regions' electoral commissions, 68.98% of residents of Irkutsk Oblast and 99.51% of residents in Ust-Orda Buryatia took part in the vote, making it one of the best attended plebiscites in the country since the 2003 Russian election. The merger was approved by an absolute majority of the electorate: by 89.77% in Irkutsk Oblast and by 97.79% in Ust-Orda Buryatia. The enlarged Irkutsk Oblast has officially come into existence on January 1, 2008.

Administrative Divisions 

The okrug is divided into six administrative districts:
 Alarsky District
 Bayandayevsky District
 Bokhansky District
 Ekhirit-Bulagatsky District
 Nukutsky District
 Osinsky District

See also 
Buryatia
Agin-Buryat Autonomous Okrug
Flag of Ust-Orda Buryat Okrug

References 

Autonomous okrugs of Russia
Russian-speaking countries and territories
Former federal subjects of Russia